Pedro Manuel de Toledo (1860–1935) was a Brazilian politician. He was born in São Paulo. He served in the Cabinet of President Hermes da Fonseca. He died in Rio de Janeiro. Toledo also served as the Governor of São Paulo from March 1932 to October 1932.

See also
Constitutionalist Revolution

References

External links
Galeria dos Governadores de São Paulo
Referência em página do Governo de Pernambuco

1860 births
1935 deaths
Governors of São Paulo (state)
Agriculture ministers of Brazil